António Dinis Duarte (born 30 January 1967), commonly known as Toni Dude, is a Cape Verdean former footballer who played as a striker.

Club career
Born in Praia, Toni spent 17 of his 18 years as a professional in Portugal, starting out at SC Vianense in 1989. He made his Primeira Liga debut in the 1992–93 season, scoring seven goals in 14 starts to help S.C. Braga finish in 12th position.

After leaving the Minho club in 2000, aged 33, Toni went on to compete in all four major levels, appearing in seven top flight games for C.D. Santa Clara in the 2001–02 campaign. He retired in 2006, amassing totals in the latter competition of 182 matches and 37 goals.

International career
Toni represented Cape Verde between 1998 and 2002, earning his first cap aged 31. Three of his six goals for the country came in the 2000 Amílcar Cabral Cup.

References

External links

1967 births
Living people
Sportspeople from Praia
Cape Verdean footballers
Association football forwards
Primeira Liga players
Liga Portugal 2 players
Segunda Divisão players
SC Vianense players
Rio Ave F.C. players
S.C. Braga players
S.C. Braga B players
C.D. Santa Clara players
Portimonense S.C. players
C.D. Feirense players
A.D. Lousada players
Merelinense F.C. players
Pevidém S.C. players
Clube Caçadores das Taipas players
Cape Verde international footballers
Cape Verdean expatriate footballers
Expatriate footballers in Portugal
Cape Verdean expatriate sportspeople in Portugal